The Lord of Lorn and the False Steward or The Lord of Lorn and the Flas Steward or The Lord of Lorn is Child ballad number 271 (Roud 113).

A ballad, Lord of Lorn and the False Steward, was entered in the Stationers' Register in 1580, with a note that it is to the tune of Greensleeves.

Synopsis

The son of the Lord of Lorn mastered his schoolwork quickly, and his father sent him to France, with a steward, to learn foreign languages.  The steward starved him and, when he went to drink from a river, followed to drown him.  The son pleaded for mercy.  The steward stripped him naked, gave him rags, and sent him out to beg service.  He went to work for a shepherd.

The steward sold the clothing and set himself up as the lord of Lorn on the money, persuading the Duke of France's daughter to marry him.  The son was in the duke's lands, and the lady noticed him, summoned him to find out why he was so mournful.  He did not tell her the story, but she took him into her service.  The steward could not persuade her otherwise, and the duke made him the groom of the stables.  One day when a horse kicked him, he told it that it did not know who it was kicking.  The lady demanded his story of him.  He told her he had sworn an oath never to tell, and she told him not to tell her, but to ignore her and tell the horse.  He did so.

The lady persuaded her father to put off the wedding three months and wrote a letter to the Lord of Lorn.  He summoned up his men and went to the castle and established there who was his son, and who the traitor.  The Duke of France had the steward executed and married his daughter to the true son.

Variants
The story is apparently derived from the romance Roswall and Lillian.    These tales are part of a group of folktales, the best known being The Goose Girl.

See also
The Sleeping Prince
Udea and her Seven Brothers
The Golden Bracelet

References

External links
The Lord of Lorn

Child Ballads
Fictional servants
Year of song unknown
False hero